Dendrobium coriaceum, commonly known as the inland rock orchid, is a species of lithophytic orchid that is endemic to North Queensland. It has tapered pseudobulbs, up to three thick, leathery leaves and up to forty yellow or cream-coloured flowers with purple markings on the labellum.

Description 
The sides lobes are erect and curved and the middle lobe has a more or less square-cut tip. Flowering occurs between August and October.

Taxonomy and naming
The inland rock orchid was first formally described in 2006 by David Jones and Mark Clements from a specimen collected near Yeppoon. It was given the name Thelychiton coriaceus and the description was published in Australian Orchid Research. In 2014, Julian Shaw changed the name to Dendrobium coriaceum. The specific epithet (coriaceum) is a Latin word meaning "of leather", referring to the leaves and fleshy flowers.

Distribution and habitat
Dendrobium coriaceum grows on rocks and cliffs on the Blackdown Tableland and in Carnarvon National Park in Queensland.

References

coriaceum
Endemic orchids of Australia
Orchids of Queensland
Plants described in 2006